Lukács is a Hungarian surname, derived from the given name Lukács, which is the Hungarian equivalent of Lucas. Alternative spellings and derivative forms in neighboring languages include Lukacs, Lukáč, Lukač, Lukach, Lucaci and Lukačić. Slovakised variant of this surname, Lukáč is the 10th most common surname in Slovakia. The surname may refer to:

Ádám Lukács (born 1996), Hungarian ice dancer
Ágnes Lukács (1920–2016), Hungarian-Jewish painter
Attila Richard Lukacs (born 1962), Canadian artist
Chuck Lukacs, artist
Dániel Lukács (born 1996), Hungarian footballer
Dénes Lukács (colonel) (1816–1868), Hungarian colonel
Dénes Lukács (tennis) (born 1987), Hungarian tennis player
Emil Boleslav Lukáč (1900–1979), Slovak poet 
Eugene Lukacs (1906–1987), American statistician
György Lukács (1885–1971), Hungarian philosopher
György Lukács (politician) (1865–1950), Hungarian politician
István Lukács (1912–1960), Hungarian footballer
Ivan Lukačić (1587–1648), Croatian musician
John Lukacs (1924–2019), American historian
John R. Lukacs (born 1947), American anthropologist
Juraj Lukáč, Slovak natural conservationist and activist
László Lukács (1850–1932), Hungarian politician and prime minister
László György Lukács (born 1983), Hungarian lawyer and politician
Mária Bajzek Lukács (born 1960), Hungarian writer and university professor
Mihály Lukács (1954–2012), Hungarian Romani politician
Milan Lukač (born 1985), Serbian footballer
Nermina Lukac (born 1990), Swedish actress
Pál Lukács (1919–1981), Hungarian violist
Patrik Lukáč (born 1994), Slovak footballer
Paul Lukas (1891–1971), American actor 
Paul Lukacs (1918–1982), Hungarian-Israeli bridge player
Péter Lukács (born 1950), Hungarian chess grandmaster
Raymond Lukács (born 1988), Romanian footballer
Rudolf Lukáč (born 1969), Slovak weightlifter
Symeon Lukach (1893–1964), Ukrainian bishop
Tamás Lukács (born 1950), Hungarian politician
Tihamér Lukács (born 1980), Hungarian footballer 
Vanda Lukács (born 1992), Hungarian tennis player
Viktória Lukács (born 1995), Hungarian handballer
Vincent Lukáč (born 1954), Slovak ice hockey player and coach
Zoltán Lukács (born 1969), Hungarian politician

See also
Lucas
Lukač (disambiguation)
Lukas

References

Hungarian-language surnames
Hungarian masculine given names